Ruhabat was a town and capital of Ruhabat District in the Ahal Province of  Turkmenistan. The village was known as Imeni Ovezberdy Kuliyeva until October 2001, when President Saparmurat Niyazov renamed it, in honor of Ruhnama. In 2013, it was merged into Ashgabat.

Facilities 
Niyazov had Ruhabat declared as the model Turkmen village of the ensuing "Golden Age". Thus, a small village with a railway yard became a town with cultural centers and shopping marts.

References

Populated places in Ahal Region